Kineshemsky Bridge is a bridge across the Volga River. It is located in Ivanovo Oblast, near Kineshma and Zavolzhsk. It is a part of Highway Kineshma-Kostroma. It connects the Trans-Volga region to the Zavolzhsky District, Ivanovo Oblast Pedestrians are prohibited from using the bridge. The total length of the bridge is 1.64 km (1 Mile).

History

References 
 Видео с открытия моста (Первый канал)
 Статья о мосте на неофициальном сайте Заволжска
 Фото с самолёта

Road bridges in Russia
Bridges completed in 2003
Bridges across the Volga River